Nanda Pal is the Himalayan mountain peak situated in the eastern part of Uttarakhand state in Pithoragarh district, India.  The altitude of the summit is 6,306 m. Nanda Pal is situated on the eastern flank of Milam Glacier on north south massif.  Other nearby peaks on the ridge are Ikualari (6,059 m), Nanda Gond (6,315 m), Nital Thaur (6,059 m).  Unta Dhura pass lies north to this peak. The peak was climbed in 1974.

Climbing History

an Indo-Tibetan Border Police team reached the summit on June 8 despite unfavorable weather. Deputy Leader Ramesh Chandra was one of the ten member who reached the summit.

See also

 List of Himalayan peaks of Uttarakhand

References

Mountains of Uttarakhand
Geography of Pithoragarh district
Six-thousanders of the Himalayas